Robert P. Watson is a professor, author, historian, frequent media commentator, and former candidate for the United States House of Representatives.

Background and education
Robert Watson was born in Harrisburg, Pennsylvania in 1962 and raised in nearby Hershey, where he attended public schools and was an all-star athlete in several sports. He earned an athletic scholarship to Virginia Tech where he completed his bachelor's degree and played football and track. He went on to earn a master's and Ph.D.

Work
Watson is the author and editor of over 40 books on topics in history and politics.

Politics
A member of the Democratic Party, Watson formed an exploratory committee in May 2005 to consider running for the United States House of Representatives in Florida's 22nd District, which pitted him against Republican incumbent Rep. Clay Shaw. Watson later withdrew from the race to focus on writing books.

Recent works
 The Ghost Ship of Brooklyn: An Untold Story of the American Revolution (Da Capo Press, 2017)
 The Nazi Titanic: The Incredible Untold Story of a Doomed Ship in World War II (Da Capo Press, 2016)
 America's First Crisis: The War of 1812 (SUNY Press, 2014) 
 The Presidents' Wives: The Office of the First Lady in US Politics, 2nd edition (Lynne Rienner Publishers, 2014)
 Affairs of State: The Untold History of Presidential Love, Sex, and Scandal (Rowman & Littlefield, 2012)
 George Washington's Final Battle: The Epic Struggle to Build a Capital and Nation (Georgetown University Press, 2021)
 Escape! The Story of the Confederacy's Infamous Libby Prison and the Civil War's Largest Jail Break (Rowman & Littlefield, 2021)
 When Washington Burned (Georgetown University Press, forthcoming in 2022)

External links

Lynn University Faculty Profile

Living people
American political scientists
People from Hershey, Pennsylvania
Florida Democrats
Place of birth missing (living people)
1962 births